The North Carolina Comedy Arts Festival is an annual comedy festival in Carrboro, North Carolina, United States.

The festival was started in 2001 by Zach Ward (of Dirty South Improv Comedy Theater) as an improv showcase and improv seminars. The festival has grown year over year. In 2009 it added stand up comedy and in 2010 expanded to include sketch comedy and film as well as extending into a month-long festival in Carrboro, North Carolina.

References

External links
Official site

Festivals in North Carolina
Comedy festivals in the United States
Tourist attractions in Orange County, North Carolina
Comedy film festivals